Rosemary Casals and Billie Jean King were the defending champions, but lost in the final to Maria Bueno and Margaret Court, 4–6, 9–7, 8–6. It was Bueno and Court's only grand slam title together.

Seeds

  Rosemary Casals /  Billie Jean King (final)
  Françoise Dürr /  Ann Jones (semifinals)
  Maria Bueno /  Margaret Court (champions)
  Mary-Ann Eisel /  Carole Graebner (first round)

Draw

External links
1968 US Open – Women's draws and results at the International Tennis Federation

Women's Doubles
US Open (tennis) by year – Women's doubles
1968 in American women's sports